Alan Hugh Dale (born 6 May 1947) is a New Zealand actor. As a child, Dale enjoyed theatre and rugby. After retiring from the sport, he took on a number of occupations, before deciding to become a professional actor at age 27. Dale subsequently moved to Australia, where he played Dr. John Forrest in The Young Doctors from 1979 to 1982. He later appeared as Jim Robinson in Neighbours, a part he played from 1985 until 1993. He left the series when he fell out with the producers over the pay he and the rest of the cast received. In 2018, it was revealed that Dale would reprise his role as Jim for one episode of Neighbours, 25 years after his last appearance.

After leaving Neighbours, Dale found he had become typecast as Jim Robinson in Australia and struggled to find work. His career was revitalised after he relocated to the United States in 2000. Since then, he has had roles in many American series including prominent parts in The O.C. (as Caleb Nichol) and Ugly Betty (as Bradford Meade), as well as recurring and guest roles in Lost, 24, NCIS, ER, The West Wing, The X-Files, Entourage and Once Upon a Time. Dale has also appeared in minor roles in films such as Star Trek: Nemesis, Hollywood Homicide, Indiana Jones and the Kingdom of the Crystal Skull, The Girl with the Dragon Tattoo and Captain America: The Winter Soldier, as well as the London West End production of Spamalot. Dale has been married to former Miss Australia Tracey Pearson since 1990 and has four children. From 2017 to 2021, Dale starred in the soap opera Dynasty as Joseph Anders.

Early life and work

Dale was born on 6 May 1947 in Dunedin, Otago, New Zealand. One of four children, Dale enjoyed his childhood, but his family was relatively poor. Growing up in New Zealand without televisions, Dale loved the theatre and amateur dramatics. His first performance was for a school concert, at the age of 13, doing an impression of comedian Shelley Berman. After moving northwards, his parents became founding members of an amateur theatre in Auckland called "The Little Dolphin Theatre". Dale often operated the stage equipment used to produce weather effects,

Dale was a skilled rugby player, but opted to move into drama instead because "the acting fraternity didn't like footballers and the footballers didn't like actors. [...] Acting gave me the same buzz and there was the chance of a longer career." He gave up rugby at the age of 21 because it was not considered a workable career at the time, and he had to support his family. Acting roles were limited in New Zealand so Dale worked in multiple jobs, including as a male model, a car salesman and a realtor. While working as a milkman he heard the disc jockey at his local radio station resign during a broadcast. Dale went over to the station and told the managers he could do a better job. They gave him a trial and then signed him up for the afternoon show. At the age of 27, he decided to become a professional actor.

Acting career

Early roles and Neighbours
Dale's first professional acting job was playing an Indian in a production of The Royal Hunt of the Sun at the Grafton Theatre in Auckland. His first on-screen role came in the New Zealand television drama Radio Waves, which although not successful, he described as "nine months of solid work and great fun." In the late 1970s, Dale moved to Australia at the age of 32, due to the limited acting work in New Zealand. He applied to the National Institute of Dramatic Art in Sydney, but was rejected because he "was a lot older than anybody else on the course." He was soon cast as Dr. John Forrest in the Australian soap opera The Young Doctors, where he remained for three-and-a-half years.

In 1985, Dale was cast in the continuing role of Jim Robinson in the Australian soap opera Neighbours, earning him acclaim across the world. He appeared on the show from the first episode and stayed for eight years before his character was killed off in 1993. He found working on Neighbours "exciting" and it enabled him to provide for his sons, but he said: "You were a totally replaceable commodity; [the production company] didn't put any value on any of the people appearing in the show." He expanded: "I didn't like it there, they were not nice people. When we decided that we hated each other, the company and me, one of the things the company did was to market everything they could out of us and pay us nothing." Dale and the company (Grundy Television) parted on "bad terms", although he would later go on to appear on the show again in 2018 and 2019.

After Neighbours, Dale struggled to find work in Australia because he was typecast as Jim Robinson. His only regular sources of income were voice-overs, and publishing magazines about his former show which he "made quite a lot of money out of". He lost most of his profits investing in a failed children's magazine. In 1999, he was cast in the American television film First Daughter, which was filmed in Australia. After discovering he could perform a convincing American accent, Dale attended the film's premiere, finally moving with his family to the United States permanently in January 2000. Dale, his second wife Tracey, and their then two-year-old son Nick moved into an "awful little flat" in Los Angeles and found an agent. Dale recalled telling his wife in Melbourne that "there's no way this is going to work. But if it does, it proves you can do anything."

Wider success

At the age of 52, he began to revive his career and started taking acting classes, something he had not thought about after being cast in Neighbours. He described his age, unknown status and willingness to work for a relatively low fee as being his main assets for getting work in America. His drama teacher, whom he has remained with ever since, told him "that you might want to play great roles, but truth is you will get cast as a specific type. Just work out your type. The others in the class said I was a bit Anthony Hopkins and a bit Sean Connery and that went into my head. I thought if I go for roles those guys would go for I'm more likely to get them." The first role he was offered was a part in a series called Sign of Life, a show about a rock band, which eventually fell through. Dale only received a couple of auditions during his first year in America, but his break came when he was cast as the South African Al Patterson in four episodes of ER. Since then, Dale has been "busier than ever".

He has appeared in many television series including guest appearances on The West Wing, Torchwood, The Lone Gunmen, Californication, and The Practice. Many of these have been recurring roles, such as the part of Tom Morrow in JAG and its spin-off NCIS, as well as appearing in three episodes, including the series finale, of The X-Files, playing the "Toothpick Man". He played the recurring role of Vice President of the United States Jim Prescott for seven episodes of the second season of 24, a part which was originally supposed to be a single scene. Dale had recurring roles in the serial Midnight Man and the Australian series Sea Patrol in 2008. He also had recurring parts on Undercovers, Entourage as John Ellis, the fictional owner of Warner Bros., and the British series Moving Wallpaper as a fictional version of himself. He had a recurring role as King George in the series Once Upon a Time, and Emmett in Hot in Cleveland, before joining the main cast of Dominion in 2014, playing General Edward Riesen.

From 2003 to 2010, Dale appeared in his longest running American roles. He starred in the Fox TV series, The O.C. playing Caleb Nichol, a wealthy tycoon. The producers saw that the character had further potential, and made his initially recurring role a regular character in the series. After 35 appearances, Caleb was killed off in the second-season episode "The O.Sea" in 2005. Dale was disappointed that Caleb was written out and described it as a mistake by the production staff. In 2006, Dale was cast in the starring role of Bradford Meade, the owner of Meade Publications in the ABC show Ugly Betty. Although he impressed the producers in his audition, he initially lost the role to a "bigger star". After said star began "causing trouble" and was fired, Dale was given the part. Bradford was killed off during the show's second season. Dale appeared in the second-season finale of Lost, "Live Together, Die Alone", as Charles Widmore, a businessman and leader of the Others. Dale's publicist was initially worried that Widmore (who was an integral part of the show's mystery) would become a starring role, meaning it would be hard for Dale to appear in both Lost and Ugly Betty at the same time. The part became a recurring role, with Dale appearing numerous times between seasons two (2006) and six (2010). He enjoyed the role but often found it difficult due to his character's unclear motivation.

In March 2008, Dale replaced Peter Davison in the lead role of King Arthur in the London West End production of Monty Python's Spamalot at the Palace Theatre. He accepted the role because he was a huge fan of Monty Python and considered that "life's too short" for him to have turned down a West End part. Although he has seen all of the Flying Circus sketches and Life Of Brian, Dale had never seen Monty Python and the Holy Grail (from which Spamalot is "lovingly ripped off") and had to buy a copy to prepare for the role. It was not his first experience in musical theatre because he appeared in a 1984 Australian production of Applause, but Dale found the comic timing of the part to be the hardest task. "On stage, the battle is to find all of the humorous moments and not skip over them. [...] There's an art to Python humour and I'm aiming to try and get every single joke just right." He was succeeded in the role by Sanjeev Bhaskar on 23 June 2008.

Dale has also made several film appearances. He appeared as the Romulan Praetor Hiren in Star Trek: Nemesis, a part he got after the actor originally cast fell ill, and had small parts in films such as Hollywood Homicide, After the Sunset, and the minor part of General Ross in Indiana Jones and the Kingdom of the Crystal Skull. Dale said his script for Kingdom of the Crystal Skull was printed on tin foil so it was impossible to replicate, in order to keep the film's plot a secret. He appeared in four films released in 2011: A Little Bit of Heaven, Priest, Don't Be Afraid of the Dark, and The Girl with the Dragon Tattoo, having joined late in the film's production.

Popularity and style
Despite his mainstream success upon his move to America, Dale remained primarily known for his role as Jim Robinson in Neighbours in the United Kingdom and Australia for several years. This was spoofed in a promotional ident for the UK's Channel 4 in 2007 which sees Dale taking part in a mock interview about the sudden upturn in his career, before being accosted by an Australian fan, who recognises him as Jim Robinson. Discussing this association after Ugly Betty's 2007 Golden Globe win, Dale noted: "Every article I read I'm always, 'Ex-soap star Jim Robinson'. Maybe now people will just get to know me as actor Alan Dale." In 2007, Amazon.co.uk reported that they had sold more DVDs of films and television shows featuring Dale than any featuring other ex-Neighbours cast members.

Dale's characters on most of the American television shows he has appeared on have shared similar character traits, which Dale describes as the "go-to powerful guy". "I either play rulers of the world or the guy who kills the ruler of the world", he said, recalling that his age benefited him after moving to the US, because "A lot of the American middle-aged faces were too familiar, I came along and people were saying 'Who is this great new guy?' And I was cheap". Following his appearance as Senator Eaton in The Killing in 2011, reviewers commented on his tendency to play powerful, wealthy and mysterious characters in many shows. Maureen Ryan of TV Squad wrote that it was "lovely to see Alan Dale playing a typically Alan Dale-ian character. He's always so great at playing That Sketchy Wealthy Guy With a Hidden Agenda, which he has now played on, I believe, 87 different shows. And he always does it well." Coincidentally, Dale's characters in Neighbours, The O.C. and Ugly Betty have all been killed off by a fatal heart attack. Christopher Rosen of The New York Observer wrote in 2008 that "with his square jaw and seemingly no nonsense attitude, Mr. Dale is the go-to actor when casting directors need a conservative-looking authoritarian. When he comes onto the screen, audiences immediately take him seriously, since he radiates rich, smug and serious. He demands your respect." Rosen says that Dale is "not even...a particularly good actor" but is "fine enough" and "bring[s] a no frills, no gimmicks style to his roles," and "manages to give a consistent performance in every show he appears on."

Jayne Nelson, writing in magazine SFX, named Dale the second most "serial" science-fiction guest star after Mark Sheppard. She wrote: "The thing is, soap-opera origins aside, Dale is always good. Which is why he keeps getting so much work....Dale never lets you down, always (well, usually) summoning up a pitch-perfect accent, too. There's something comforting about his presence on a show, as though the fact he's in it has lent it some weight." In a profile of his work on "cult shows", Ben Rawson-Jones of Digital Spy called Dale an "institution".

Personal life

In 1968, Dale married his girlfriend, Claire. The couple had two children, Simon and Matthew, both of whom are involved in the entertainment industry, Simon as a radio announcer at Kiss 100 and Matthew as a writer, film maker and actor. The marriage ended in divorce in 1979. At the time, Dale lived in Auckland but after the divorce he moved to Sydney with his sons.

On 8 April 1990, he married Tracey Pearson, the 1986 Miss Australia, whom he met at the 1986 Australian Grand Prix, when she was 21 and he was 39. Dale described it as "the most appropriate relationship I've ever had." Dale also has two children from this marriage, Daniel and Nick.

He and his family now live in Manhattan Beach, California and also owns property in Australia. Dale sold his holiday home in New Zealand in 2011 for $1.25m. Both of Dale's parents died in 2007. Dale describes his life philosophy as being Winston Churchill's quote "Never, never, never give up", and counts Gene Hackman as his "big acting hero".

Filmography

Films

Television

Video games

Theatre
 Spamalot (2008) – King Arthur

References

External links

1947 births
Living people
20th-century New Zealand male actors
21st-century New Zealand male actors
New Zealand male film actors
New Zealand male musical theatre actors
New Zealand male television actors
New Zealand male video game actors
New Zealand male voice actors
Actors from Dunedin
Actors from Manhattan Beach, California
Male actors from Sydney
New Zealand expatriates in Australia
New Zealand expatriates in the United States
People educated at Onehunga High School